This is a list of current, former, and upcoming television series broadcast by the Family Channel.

Current programming

Original programming

Live action series
 Are You Afraid of the Dark? (1996–97; 1999–2005; May 3, 2021)
 Backstage (March 18, 2016–present; reruns)
 Degrassi: Next Class (January 4, 2016 – present; reruns)
 The Fabulous Show With Fay and Fluffy
 Holly Hobbie (January 12, 2019–present)
 Life with Derek (2006–16; reruns)
 Malory Towers (July 1, 2020 – present)
 My Perfect Landing (March 1, 2020 – present)
 The Next Step (March 8, 2013–present)
 Ruby and the Well
 The Other Kingdom (reruns)

Animated series
 Dorg Van Dango (August 1, 2020−present)
 Lucas the Spider (2021–present)
 Slugterra: Ascension
 Summer Memories (2022 – present)

Acquired programming

Live action series
 Born to Spy
 The Bureau of Magical Things (May 4, 2020 – present)
 The Canterville Ghost
 Degrassi Junior High
 Dwight in Shining Armor (January 18, 2021 – present)
 Family Matters (July 12, 2021)
 Gilmore Girls (May 30, 2016 ‒ present)
 Goosebumps
 Just Add Magic (April 20, 2019 – present)
 Lockdown (July 3, 2020 – present)

Reality series
 Backyard Blowout
 Create the Escape
 Domino Masters (2022 – present)

Animated series
 Caillou (2018(?); August 16, 2021-present)
 Care Bears: Unlock the Magic
 Carmen Sandiego (2023–present)
 Denis and Me
 Johnny Test
 Miraculous: Tales of Ladybug & Cat Noir (October 10, 2016–present)
 The Smurfs
 Strawberry Shortcake: Berry in the Big City

Programming from DreamWorks Animation

Animated series
 Abominable and the Invisible City (October 21, 2022 – present)
 The Boss Baby: Back in Business (March 2, 2020 – present)
 DreamWorks Dragons (August 12, 2017 – present)
 The Epic Tales of Captain Underpants (April 19, 2021 – present)
 Spirit Riding Free (May 18, 2019 – present)
 Trolls: The Beat Goes On! (May 4, 2020 – present)

Former programming

Original programming

Live action series 

 African Skies (1992–97)
 Anna Banana (1994–97)
 Audubon's Animal Adventures (1997–99)
 Bajillionaires
 Baxter
 BB & Jennifer (1990–92)
 The Big Garage (1995–2001)
 Bobobobs (1989–92)
 Connor Undercover
 Debra!
 Fabulicious Day (1996–97)
 Gaming Show (In My Parents' Garage)
 Hello Mrs. Cherrywinkle (February 3, 1997 – 2001)
 In a Heartbeat (2000–04)
 Kingdom Adventure (1990–92)
 The Latest Buzz
 Lost & Found Music Studios
 Massive Monster Mayhem
 Mentors
 MusiQuest (1990–91)
 Naturally, Sadie (2005–12)
 Nilus the Sandman (1996–99)
 OMG!
 Overruled!
 Playdate
 Radio Free Roscoe (2004–08)
 Raising Expectations
 Really Me
 Something Else (2003–08)
 Take Off (1991–95)
 Try It
 UMIGO
 We are Savvy
 What's Up Warthogs!
 Wingin' It

Animated series 

 The Busy World of Richard Scarry (January 1, 1994 – 2001)
 Chip and Potato
 The Deep
 Fangbone!
 Franklin (1997–2005)
 Franny's Feet (2004–14)
 Henry's World (2002–13)
 Hoze Houndz (1999–2009)
 Justin Time 
 Katie and Orbie (1994–2006)
 King
 Kleo the Misfit Unicorn (1997–99)
 The Legend of White Fang (1992–94)
 The Little Lulu Show (1998–2003)
 The Magical Adventures of Quasimodo (1996–99)
 Mighty Mike
 The Neverending Story (1995–98)
 Papa Beaver's Storytime
 Polly Pocket
 Rev & Roll
 Ripley's Believe It or Not! (1999–2001; 2003–04)
 The Secret World of Benjamin Bear (2004–14)
 Slugterra
 Stella and Sam

Acquired programming

Programming from Disney

Live action series 

 8 Simple Rules (2005–07)
 A.N.T. Farm
 Aaron Stone
 Adventures in Wonderland (1992–98)
 Austin & Ally
 Bear in the Big Blue House (2006–07)
 Bill Nye the Science Guy (1998–2001)
 Blossom (1998–2000)
 The Book of Pooh (2001–03)
 Boy Meets World (2002–06)
 The Brendan Leonard Show
 Brotherly Love (2004–06)
 Bug Juice (1998–2002)
 Bunnytown
 Cory in the House (2007–10; 2012–13)
 Crash & Bernstein
 Dinosaurs (1998–2001)
 Dog with a Blog
 Dumbo's Circus (1988–97)
 Even Stevens (2001–09)
 Flash Forward (1995–2000)
 Girl Meets World 
 Going Wild with Jeff Corwin (1998–99)
 Good Luck Charlie 
 Hannah Montana (2007–13)
 Honey, I Shrunk the Kids: The TV Show (1999–2004)
 I Didn't Do It
 I'm in the Band
 Imagination Movers
 The Jersey (2000–03)
 Johnny and the Sprites
 Jonas (2009–11)
 K.C. Undercover
 Kicked Out
 Life with Bonnie
 Liv and Maddie
 Lizzie McGuire (2001–05)
 Mad Libs (1999–2000)
 Malcolm in the Middle (2017)
 The Mickey Mouse Club
 Mousercise (1988–95)
 Muppets Tonight (1998–2000)
 My So-Called Life
 Omba Mokomba (1997–99)
 Out of the Box (1999–2003)
 Pair of Kings
 Phil of the Future (2004–12)
 Popular
 Power Rangers (2002–09)
 Shake It Up
 The Sinbad Show (2006–07)
 Sing Me a Story with Belle
 Smart Guy (2002–08)
 So Random!
 So Weird (1999–2001)
 Sonny with a Chance
 Speechless
 The Suite Life of Zack & Cody (2006–14)
 The Suite Life on Deck (2008–13) 
 Teen Angel (2002–04)
 Teen Win, Lose or Draw (1989–91)
 That's So Raven (2003–10)
 The Torkelsons (1997–98)
 Welcome to Pooh Corner (1988–97)
 Wizards of Waverly Place
 You and Me Kid (1988–92)
 You Wish
 Your Big Break
 Z Games 
 Zeke and Luther
 Zorro (1989–98)

Animated series 

 101 Dalmatians: The Series (2003–04)
 Adventures of the Gummi Bears (1994–2001)
 Aladdin (1997–2001; 2004–05)
 American Dragon: Jake Long
 Bonkers (1993; 1996–99)
 Brandy & Mr. Whiskers
 Buzz Lightyear of Star Command (2001–03)
 The Buzz on Maggie
 Chip 'n Dale: Rescue Rangers (1989; 1993–99; 2003–04)
 Daigunder (2004–05)
 Darkwing Duck (1991; 1995–2001)
 Dave the Barbarian (2004–05)
 Digimon Data Squad
 Donald Duck Presents (1988–93)
 Donald's Quack Attack (1993–99)
 Doug (1999–2001)
 DuckTales (1992–93; 1996–97; 2001–03)
 The Emperor's New School
 Fillmore!
 Fish Hooks
 Gargoyles (1999–2001)
 Good Morning, Mickey! (1988–92)
 Goof Troop (1996–2005)
 Gravity Falls
 Handy Manny
 Hercules (1999–2000; 2004–05)
 Higglytown Heroes
 House of Mouse (2001–05)
 Jake and the Never Land Pirates
 Jason and the Heroes of Mount Olympus (2004–05)
 JoJo's Circus
 Jungle Junction
 Kick Buttowski: Suburban Daredevil
 Kim Possible (2003–09)
 The Legend of Tarzan
 Lilo & Stitch: The Series
 Little Einsteins
 The Little Mermaid (1997–99; 2004–05)
 Lloyd in Space (2005–06)
 Marsupilami (1995–96)
 Mickey Mouse Clubhouse
 Mickey's Mouse Tracks (1996–99)
 Mickey Mouse Works (2000–01)
 Mighty Ducks (2001–02)
 Mon Colle Knights (2003–04)
 The Mouse Factory (1988–90; 1992–95)
 Mouseterpiece Theater (1989–90; 1992–93; 1996–97)
 My Friends Tigger & Pooh
 The New Adventures of Winnie the Pooh (1994–96; 2000–07)
 Nightmare Ned (2001–03)
 Ōban Star-Racers
 PB&J Otter (1998–2003; 2005–06)
 Pepper Ann (2000–03)
 Phineas and Ferb (2008–15)
 The Proud Family (2001–07)
 Pucca
 Raw Toonage (2001–02)
 Recess (1999–2011)
 The Replacements
 The Shnookums and Meat Funny Cartoon Show (2001–02)
 Special Agent Oso
 Spider-Man
 Stanley (2001–07)
 Super Robot Monkey Team Hyperforce Go!
 TaleSpin (1996)
 Teacher's Pet
 Teamo Supremo (2002–04)
 Timon & Pumbaa (1998–2004)
 Wander Over Yonder
 The Weekenders (2002–09)
 W.I.T.C.H.
 The Wuzzles (1993–95, 1998–99)
 Yin Yang Yo!

Special programming 
 Disney Channel Games
 Disney's Friends for Change Games
 Mickey Mouse
 Take Two with Phineas and Ferb

Programming from Nickelodeon

Live action series 
 The Adventures of Pete & Pete (2000–02)
 All That (2002–05)
 The Amanda Show (2002–04)
 Clarissa Explains It All (1999–2001)
 Ned's Declassified School Survival Guide (2005–12)
 Zoey 101 (2005–12)

Animated series
 O'Grady (2006)

Programming from DreamWorks Animation

Animated series 

 The Adventures of Puss in Boots
 All Hail King Julien
 Dawn of the Croods
 DreamWorksTV
 Home: Adventures with Tip & Oh
 Madagascar: A Little Wild
 The Mr. Peabody & Sherman Show
 Trollhunters: Tales of Arcadia
 Turbo Fast

Programming from Awesomeness

 Arts Academy
 AwesomenessTV
 Betch
 Cheerleaders
 Cook That
 Food Truck Fanatics
 Guidance
 I Pranked My Parents
 LA Story
 Let's be Honest
 Make Me Over
 Rebecca Black's Life After Friday
 Third Wheel
 What Parents Don't Know

Other programming

Live action series

 ALF (2000–03)
 Amazing Animals (1997–2001)
 Amazing Stories (2002–03)
 Andromeda
 Animals in Action
 Art Attack (1998–2005)
 Chicken Minute (1992–95)
 Crash Zone
 Creeped Out
 Dance Fever
 Darcy's Wild Life
 Deadtime Stories
 The Dick Van Dyke Show (1994–98)
 Dr. Ken
 The Elephant Princess
 Elmo's World (2001–03)
 Eric's World (January 1, 1991 – 1996)
 The Famous Jett Jackson
 Five Mile Creek (1988–92)
 Flash Cats (1996–97)
 Flight 29 Down
 The Fresh Prince of Bel-Air
 The George Burns and Gracie Allen Show
 God Friended Me
 The Good Place
 Gortimer Gibbon's Life on Normal Street
 The Great African Wildlife Rescue
 H2O: Just Add Water
 Hank Zipzer
 Happy Castle
 The Haunting Hour: The Series
 Heirs of the Night
 Huckleberry Finn and His Friends (1990–91)
 Kamen Rider: Dragon Knight
 Kids Incorporated (1988–96)
 The Little Vampire (1988–90)
 Mako Mermaids
 Majority Rules!
 Microsoap
 Mighty Machines (1994–96)
 My Side of the Sky
 The New Adventures of Black Beauty (1991–92)
 New MacDonald's Farm
 Nowhere Boys
 Ocean Girl
 The Ozlets (1995–96)
 Parenthood
 Predators and Prey (1989–91)
 The Return of the Antelope
 Secret Life of Toys (1994–96)
 So Little Time (2005–07)
 Space Cases (1996–2000)
 Spellbinder (1996–98)
 Spellbinder: Land of the Dragon Lord (1998–2000)
 Supergirl
 Wayne Brady's Comedy IQ
 Wildlife International (1991–92)
 The Witches and the Grinnygog (1989–90)
 Woof! (1989–95)
 Yo Gabba Gabba!
 The Zoo

Reality series

 American Ninja Warrior Junior
 Are You Smarter than a 5th Grader?
 Baketopia
 Bear Grylls Survival School
 Beat the Clock
 Crime Scene Kitchen
 Game of Talents
 Get Out of My Room
 Heads Up!
 Hole in the Wall
 Just Like Mom and Dad
 Top Chef Junior
 Ultimate Tag
 Wipeout
 The X Factor
 The X Factor: Celebrity

Animated series

 The Adventures of Figaro Pho
 The Adventures of Tintin (1991–95)
 ALVINNN!!! and the Chipmunks
 Babar (1990–2000)
 Billy the Cat (1997–2001)
 Bob the Builder
 Boy Girl Dog Cat Mouse Cheese
 Brown Bag (1991–92)
 Bumpety Boo (1990–93)
 Care Bears: Unlock the Magic
 C.L.Y.D.E. (1991–94)
 Curious George
 Daniel Tiger's Neighborhood
 Gadget & the Gadgetinis (2003–04)
 Gadget Boy (1998–2000)
 Grizzy and the Lemmings
 Harry and His Bucket Full of Dinosaurs
 Hey Duggee
 Inspector Gadget
 Janosch's Dream World (1990–93)
 Julius Jr.
 Kate & Mim-Mim
 Kuu Kuu Harajuku
 Lalaloopsy
 Lego Friends
 Lego Jurassic World: Legend of Isla Nublar
 The Little Flying Bears (1990–96)
 Madeline
 Maya the Bee (1990–93)
 Mrs. Pepper Pot (1990–93)
 My Knight and Me
 Nature Cat
 The New Adventures of Figaro Pho
 Norman Picklestripes
 Ovide and the Gang (1988–92)
 Paddington specials (1988–92)
 Rainbow Butterfly Unicorn Kitty (2019-2021)
 Rainbow Ruby
 Sadie Sparks
 Sarah & Duck
 The Save-Ums!
 Sherlock Holmes in the 22nd Century (1999–2001)
 Sonic Boom
 Spongo, Fuzz and Jalapeña
 Spirou (1994–99)
 Storybook Classics (1991–92)
 Strawberry Shortcake's Berry Bitty Adventures
 Supernoobs
 Sunny Bunnies
 Thomas & Friends
 Thunderbirds Are Go
 Tickety Toc
 Twirlywoos
 Wild Grizzly
 The Wind in the Willows (1988–91)
 The Wonderful Wizard of Oz (1988–91)
 The World of David the Gnome (1988–90)
 Wow! Wow! Wubbzy!
 Zak Storm

References

External links
 

Family